Michele Hutchison (born 1972) is a British writer and translator, mainly of Dutch-language literature. She won the 2020 International Booker Prize for her translation of The Discomfort of Evening by Marieke Lucas Rijneveld, which according to the Booker website her "striking translation captures in all its wild, violent beauty." She was also awarded the Vondel Prize 2019 for her translation of Stage Four by Sander Kollaard.<ref>{{cite web|title='Article about Vondel Prize in The Low Countries'''|url=https://the-low-countries.com/article/vondel-translation-prize-to-michele-hutchison}}</ref>

Biography
Hutchison was born in the United Kingdom and educated at the University of East Anglia, University of Cambridge, and University of Lyon. A former commissioning editor at various publishing houses, she has translated more than twenty books from Dutch and one from French. Her translations include poetry, graphic novels, children’s books, short stories, literary non-fiction and novels by Marieke Lucas Rijneveld, Ilja Leonard Pfeijffer, Esther Gerritsen, Sander Kollaard, Pierre Bayard, and Sasja Janssen. She has lived in Amsterdam since 2004.

She is the co-author (with Rina Mae Acosta) of the parenting book The Happiest Kids in the World: What We Can Learn from Dutch Parents.

Selection of translated titles 
 Marieke Lucas Rijneveld: The Discomfort of Evening Annejet van der Zijl: An American Princess Ilja Leonard Pfeijffer: La Superba and Rupert: A Confession Joris Luyendijk: People Like Us: The Truth About Reporting the Middle East Brecht Evens: The Making Of, The Wrong Place, and Panther (graphic novels, with Laura Watkinson)
 Simone van der Vlugt: Safe as Houses, The Reunion, and Shadow Sister Tom Lanoye: Fortunate Slaves Pierre Bayard: How to Talk About Places You’ve Never Been translations and articles in journals and anthologies including Words Without Borders, The High Window, The Loch Raven Review, The Enchanted Verses, The Penguin Book of Dutch Short Stories, and Swallows and Floating Horses''

References 

1972 births
Living people
Alumni of the University of East Anglia
Dutch–English translators
International Booker Prize winners